The Hotel Sacher Salzburg, Austria, is Salzburg's only grand hotel, a 5 star deluxe hotel. The house is built in the style of the turn of the century, located on the shore of the Salzach river, and offers a view of the Altstadt. The hotel is located a few minutes away from the theatres of the Salzburg Festival.

History 
The hotel was built between 1863 and 1866 by the hotelier and master builder Carl Freiherr von Schwarz as an Oesterreichischer Hof (Austrian Court) hotel - and it operated under the name "Österreichischer Hof" until 2000. It enjoyed popularity from the opening of the hotel in 1866 due to its position with members of ruling houses, noblemen, high clergymen and artist as guests in the first year.

With the beginning of the Salzburg Festival, the "Austrian court" became the social centre of the festival with the three stars, Max Reinhardt, Hugo von Hofmannsthal and Richard Strauss, and the artists playing a part, living next door in the hotel to the heads of the European and overseas society.

In  1988, the Gürtler family purchased the hotel. All of its rooms and restaurants were redesigned, the interior was adapted to its historical style, and its rooms and suites were equipped with rare art treasures.

References

 Frommer's Austria - Darwin Porter, Danforth Prince. p. 229.
 The 10 Best of Everything: An Ultimate Guide for Travelers - Nathaniel Lande, Andrew Lande. p. 400.

External links
 

Hotels in Austria
Hotels established in 1866
Hotel Sacher Salzburg
Hotel Sacher Salzburg
Economy of Salzburg (state)
19th-century architecture in Austria